Graham Streeter (born January 22, 1964) is an American film director, screenwriter and cinematographer.

Streeter was raised in northern California until high school.  He lived in Osaka, Japan for 10 years while working in film and television, then returned to the United States and attended California State University, Sacramento. Streeter earned a double degree in international business administration and Japanese, then worked for Nippon Television in Los Angeles as a television field producer founding Imperative Pictures in Hollywood.

Streeter began his career in filmmaking by making short films, such as Crickets & Potatoes, a look at the absurdity of holiday dinner gatherings, and  Frank in Five, with  Paul Winfield, Gedde Watanabe, and Zelda Rubinstein.

Streeter wrote, directed and also lensed the 2019 feature film I May Regret, starring Lisa Goodman and  Denise Dorado, Imperfect Sky (2015), starring Blake Scott Lewis and  Sam Lucas Smith, Blind Malice (2014) starring Grace Zabriskie, Tim Bagley, Grim Hans-Christian Bernhoft and Angelina Prendergast, produced by Imperative Pictures.

Streeter also wrote and directed the 2013 academically proclaimed documentary Boys in Peril, award-winning 2005 feature film Cages starring Mako Iwamatsu, Zelda Rubinstein and Bobby Tonelli.  The film stayed in release in Asia for four weeks in 2007 and was the first Asian film to be purchased by the Hallmark Channel.

His 2018 film I May Regret was selected for the San Diego International Film Festival. The film won the Grand Prix at the Vienna Independent Film Festival.

Awards

I May Regret (2019)
Winner Grand Prix, Vienna Independent Film Festival
Winner Best Director, Sydney Indie Film Festival 2019
Winner Best Feature Film, Durango International Film Festival 2019
Best Break-Out Film, San Diego International Film Festival 2019

Imperfect Sky (2015)
Winner Best Pictures, Dublin Underground film Festival 2015
Winner Best Feature Film Hollywood Independent Cinefest 2015
Winner Best Drama, Best Male Actor, Best Supporting Male Actor, Sydney Indie Film Festival 2015

Blind Malice (2014)
Winner Best Pictures, Sacramento International Film Festival 2014
Best Thriller, Best Actress, Hollywood Reel Independent Film Festival 2014

References

External links
 
  Graham Streeter official site
  Imperative Pictures official site

1964 births
Living people
American male screenwriters
California State University, Sacramento alumni
Film directors from California
American cinematographers
Screenwriters from California